Fox College Football (or Fox CFB for short) is the branding used for broadcasts of NCAA Division I FBS college football games produced by Fox Sports, and broadcast primarily by Fox, FS1, and FS2.

Initial college football broadcasts on the Fox network were limited to selected bowl games, beginning with the Cotton Bowl Classic from 1999 to 2014. From 2007 to 2010, Fox broadcast the Bowl Championship Series (excluding games played at the Rose Bowl stadium, whose rights were held by ABC under a separate agreement), branded as the BCS on Fox.

In 2012, Fox began to air a regular schedule of Saturday college football games during the regular season. Fox primarily airs coverage of the Big Ten, Big 12, and Pac-12, and holds rights to the Big Ten and Pac-12 championship games (with the latter alternating yearly with ESPN/ABC). Since 2020, Fox has aired games from the Mountain West Conference (including Boise State home games, and the Mountain West championship game). Fox also holds rights to the Holiday Bowl.

Coverage history

FSN coverage (1996–2019) 
In order to better compete with national networks like ESPN, since its inception the Fox Sports Networks (FSN) has carried college football games from the then Pac-10 conference and Big 12 conference. These telecasts were distributed to individual Fox Sports Networks and other affiliates. In 2011 FSN added a package of Conference USA football games. Many of these games were aired exclusively, aired as a simulcast, or aired on tape delay on Fox College Sports.

Pac-12 games moved from FSN to Fox, FX and eventually FS1 in 2012. The C-USA left Fox Sports entirely in 2016. FSN affiliates continued to largely hold the third-tier rights to many Big 12 teams until 2020, when ESPN+ acquired the tier 3 media rights to all but two of the conference's members (with the only holdouts being the Oklahoma Sooners, who maintained their contract with Fox Sports Oklahoma, and the Texas Longhorns, who have a long-term deal with ESPN and IMG College to operate its Longhorn Network).

After the sale of FSN to Sinclair Broadcast Group as part of Disney's acquisition of 21st Century Fox (and their subsequent rebranding as Bally Sports in 2021), production duties for FSN's Conference USA broadcasts were assumed by new sister network Stadium in 2020. The Atlantic Coast Conference's syndication package for regional sports networks—which are produced by Raycom Sports, had primarily been carried by FSN channels since 2011, were also retained by Bally Sports.

Cotton Bowl Classic (1998–2013) 
The Fox network acquired its first college football telecast in 1998, when it obtained the broadcast rights to the annual Cotton Bowl Classic held each January on (eventually, the day after) New Year's Day; the first game to be shown on the network as part of the deal was held on January 1, 1999. Fox renewed its contract to carry the game in 2010, in a four-year agreement that ran through the 2013 NCAA college football season.

Fox lost the rights to the Cotton Bowl to ESPN for the 2015 edition, as the cable network holds the television contract to all six bowl games that encompass the College Football Playoff system under a twelve-year deal worth over $7.3 billion. The Cotton Bowl was the only game among the six that was not already broadcast by ESPN.

Bowl Championship Series, launch of Big Ten Network (2006–2009) 
From the 2006 through the 2009 seasons, Fox held the broadcast rights to most of the games comprising the Bowl Championship Series (BCS) – including the Sugar Bowl, the Fiesta Bowl and the Orange Bowl, as well as the BCS Championship Game. Fox paid close to $20 million per game for the rights to televise the BCS games. The network's contract with the BCS excluded any event in the series that was held at the Rose Bowl stadium, such as the Rose Bowl Game and the 2010 BCS National Championship Game, as ABC already had a separate arrangement with the Pasadena Tournament of Roses Association to serve as the broadcaster for the games.

ESPN, which is majority owned by ABC's corporate parent The Walt Disney Company and serves as the producer for all of ABC's sports coverage, would displace Fox outright as the broadcaster of the BCS beginning in the 2010–11 season. This left the Fox network with only the Cotton Bowl Classic as the sole college football game, to which it held the television rights until the 2013–14 season.

Expansion of national regular season coverage, Big Ten contract (2011–2019) 
Beginning with the 2011 season, sister cable channel FX began airing a "game of the week" on Saturdays featuring matchups from the Big 12, Conference USA, and Pac-12. The Fox network also obtained the rights to air the Big Ten Conference's new football championship game beginning that season and running through 2016, as part of Fox Sports' partnership with the conference on the Big Ten Network. Fox also acquired bi-yearly rights to the inaugural Pac-12 Football Championship Game, alternating with ESPN/ABC.

Beginning with the 2012 season, Fox added regular season games on Saturdays to its lineup; it broadcast eight afternoon games and twelve nighttime games throughout the season, with the latter telecasts airing as part of a new strategy by the network to carry more sports programming on Saturday nights during prime time. FS1 replaced FX's coverage upon its launch in August 2013, though some overflow coverage has aired on FX occasionally when warranted; since 2017, overflow coverage has been carried FS2, and before that on Fox Business Network, which usually carries paid programming on Saturday afternoons of little consequence to pre-emption.

Fox's coverage of the 2015 season opened with a game on FS1 featuring the Michigan Wolverines at the Utah Utes. As the first game featuring new head coach Jim Harbaugh, the season premiere was promoted with a touring "HarBus"—decorated with a sweater and khakis in imitation of Harbaugh's on-field wardrobe—travelling to Salt Lake City for the game, accompanied by a group of "HarBros" dressed like Harbaugh. The tour concluded at Salt Lake City's Grand America Hotel for game day; the bus itself was barred from entering the University of Utah's campus.

On July 12, 2016, the San Francisco 49ers announced that they had taken over the Foster Farms Bowl (now known as the Redbox Bowl), and had reached a four-year deal to move the game to Fox and Fox Deportes beginning in 2016. It was also reported by Sports Business Journal that Fox was pursuing a share of the Big Ten's primary football rights. Fox began streaming select college football games in 360-degree video for the 2016 season. The following year, FS1 also acquired rights to the Holiday Bowl, ending a long-standing relationship between the game and ESPN.

On July 24, 2017, the Big Ten Conference announced that Fox and ESPN had acquired rights to its games under a six-year deal beginning in the 2017 season. The contract also includes an extension of Fox's contract to operate Big Ten Network through 2032. The deal gives Fox the first choice of games on most weeks, including marquee games such as the Michigan/Ohio State game—which had been a fixture of ABC's college football schedule for over a half-decade. The game will remain in its traditional noon slot on the last day of the Big Ten's regular season.

Fox promoted its addition of Big Ten football with promotional campaigns focusing on each team; a Children of the Corn-themed commercial focusing on the Nebraska Cornhuskers was pulled after complaints by the school.

Big Noon Saturday, Mountain West contract, Big Ten renewal (2019–present) 
Prior to the 2019 season, Fox lost its rights to future Big 12 championship games to ESPN as part of an expansion of its rights to the conference. Fox declined to bid on the 2019, 2021, and 2023 games.

In the 2019 season, Fox introduced a new flagship Noon ET window known as Big Noon Saturday. The games are accompanied by a pre-game show, Big Noon Kickoff. A Fox executive stated that the network's highest-rated games were often those with a Noon kickoff, and that the network also wanted to avoid competition from other highly viewed windows such as the SEC on CBS and ABC's Saturday Night Football. The new emphasis on early games proved successful: in the first weeks of the 2019 season, Fox had the highest-rated game in the timeslot on multiple occasions. This pattern continued into subsequent seasons, with Big Noon Saturday overtaking the SEC on CBS as having the highest average viewership in the 2021 season, and the Michigan/Ohio State game (which saw Michigan end an eight-game losing streak in the rivalry) being the highest-rated regular-season game of the 2021 season, and most-watched regular-season game since the Alabama–LSU game in 2019.

Due to the early kickoff times, the package has faced criticism for having undue impacts on teams not based in the Eastern Time Zone (ET), including from University of Oklahoma Athletics Director Joe Castiglione (who felt that a Noon ET kickoff for a 2021 game against Nebraska, marking the 50th anniversary of their 1971 "Game of the Century", would diminish its profile), and Stanford head coach David Shaw (who, in particular, criticized Fox Sports for scheduling noon kickoffs involving visiting Pac-12 teams). In August 2021, University of Oklahoma president Joe Harroz cited criticism of Big Noon Saturday when discussing the Sooners' proposed move to the SEC, arguing that the Big 12 conference would be "last in line" in negotiating new media deals, and that "our fans talk about that. It also matters to student-athletes. When those who go before you, in terms of negotiations for 2025 and beyond, if those premiere slots are already taken up, it impacts things in a material way. It translates into disadvantages in recruiting the top talent, disadvantages for our student-athletes and a detriment to the fan experience."

On January 9, 2020, the Mountain West Conference announced that its next top-tier basketball and football contracts would be split between CBS Sports and Fox Sports under a six-year deal, with Fox replacing ESPN. Fox will hold rights to 23 games per-season, including the conference championship and all Boise State home games (since 2012, as part of concessions to remain in the conference, the Mountain West has allowed Boise State's home games to be sold as a separate package from the remainder of its media rights). CBS Sports Network will remain the main broadcaster for the conference outside of these games.

On August 18, 2022, Fox renewed its rights to the Big Ten under a seven-year deal beginning in the 2023 season. Under the new contract, Fox, CBS, and NBC will hold rights to Noon, 3:30 p.m. ET, and prime time games respectively. There will be a larger number of games on the Fox broadcast network, and an option to air "premier" Big Ten games in other timeslots after USC and UCLA move to the conference in 2024. Fox will air four Big Ten championship games in odd-numbered years over the length of the contract.

All rankings are from that week's AP Poll, and that week's CFP rankings.

 2019 

 August 31: Florida Atlantic at  5 Ohio State in Columbus, Ohio, Ohio State 45–21
 September 7: Army at  7 Michigan in Ann Arbor, Michigan, Michigan 24–21(2OT)
 September 14:  6 Ohio State at Indiana in Bloomington, Indiana, Ohio State 51–10
 September 21:  11 Michigan at  13 Wisconsin in Madison, Wisconsin, Wisconsin 35–14
 September 28: Texas Tech at  6 Oklahoma in Norman, Oklahoma, Oklahoma 55–16
 October 5:  14 Iowa at  19 Michigan in Ann Arbor, Michigan, Michigan 10–3
 October 12:  6 Oklahoma vs  11 Texas in Dallas, Texas, Oklahoma 34–27
 October 19: West Virginia at  5 Oklahoma in Norman, Oklahoma, Oklahoma 52–14
 October 26:  13 Wisconsin at  3 Ohio State in Columbus, Ohio, Ohio State 38–7
 November 2: Nebraska at Purdue in West Lafayette, Indiana, Purdue 31–27 (with Brando, Tillman, and Harvey)
 November 9: Maryland at  3 (CFP  1) Ohio State in Columbus, Ohio, Ohio State 73–14
 November 16: Michigan State at  14 (CFP  15) Michigan in Ann Arbor, Michigan, Michigan 44–10
 November 23:  9 (CFP  8) Penn State at  2 (CFP  2) Ohio State in Columbus, Ohio, Ohio State 28–17
 November 30:  2 (CFP  1) Ohio State at  10 (CFP  13) Michigan in Ann Arbor, Michigan, Ohio State 56–27
 December 7:  2 (CFP  1) Ohio State at  10 (CFP  8) Wisconsin in Indianapolis, Indiana, Ohio State 34–21 (2019 Big Ten Championship Game, 8 ET kickoff)

 2020 

 September 12: Arkansas State at Kansas State in Manhattan, Kansas, Arkansas State 35–31
 September 26: Kansas State at  3 Oklahoma in Norman, Oklahoma, Kansas State 38–35
 October 3: TCU at  9 Texas in Austin, Texas, TCU 33–31
 October 10:  22 Texas vs. Oklahoma in Dallas, Texas, Oklahoma 53–45(4OT)
 October 17: Kansas at West Virginia in Morgantown, West Virginia, West Virginia 38–17
 October 24: Nebraska at  5 Ohio State in Columbus, Ohio, Ohio State 52–17
 October 31: Michigan State at  13 Michigan in Ann Arbor, Michigan, Michigan State 27-24
November 7: Arizona State at  20 USC in Los Angeles, California, USC 28-27
November 14: TCU at West Virginia in Morgantown, West Virginia (with Davis and Helfrich), West Virginia 24-6
November 21:  9 Indiana at  3 Ohio State in Columbus, Ohio, Ohio State 42–35
November 28: Texas Tech at  22 (CFP  23) Oklahoma State in Stillwater, Oklahoma (with Davis and Helfrich), Oklahoma State 50-44
December 5: Texas at Kansas State in Manhattan, Kansas, Texas 69-31
December 12: Utah at  21 (CFP  21) Colorado in Boulder, Colorado, Utah 38-21
December 19:  15 (CFP  14) Northwestern at  3 (CFP  4) Ohio State (2020 Big Ten Championship Game) in Indianapolis, Indiana, Ohio State 22–10

2021
September 4:  19 Penn State at  12 Wisconsin in Madison, Wisconsin, Penn State 16–10
September 11:  12 Oregon at  3 Ohio State in Columbus, Ohio, Oregon 35-28
September 18: Nebraska at  3 Oklahoma in Norman, Oklahoma, Oklahoma 23–16	
September 25:  12 Notre Dame vs  18 Wisconsin in Chicago, Illinois, Notre Dame 41–13
October 2:  14 Michigan at Wisconsin in Madison, Wisconsin, Michigan 38–17	
October 9: Maryland at  7 Ohio State in Columbus, Ohio (with Goldsmith, Huard, and Feldman), Ohio State 66–17		
October 16:  12 Oklahoma State at  25 Texas in Austin, Texas, Oklahoma State 32–24	
October 23: Northwestern at  6 Michigan in Ann Arbor, Michigan, Michigan 33–7	
October 30:  6 Michigan at  8 Michigan State in East Lansing, Michigan, Michigan State 37–33	
November 6:  6 (CFP  5) Ohio State at Nebraska in Lincoln, Nebraska, Ohio State 26–17	
November 13:  4 (CFP  8) Oklahoma at  18 (CFP  13) Baylor in Waco, Texas, Baylor 27–14	
November 20: Iowa State at  12 (CFP  13) Oklahoma in Norman, Oklahoma, Oklahoma 28–21	
November 27:  2 Ohio State at  6 (CFP  5) Michigan in Ann Arbor, Michigan, Michigan 42–27
December 4:  2 Michigan at  15 (CFP  13) Iowa (2021 Big Ten Championship Game) in Indianapolis, Indiana, (8 ET kickoff), Michigan 42–3

2022
 September 10:  1 Alabama at Texas in Austin, Texas, Alabama 20–19	
 September 17:  6 Oklahoma at Nebraska in Lincoln, Nebraska, Oklahoma 49–14	
 September 24: Maryland at  4 Michigan in Ann Arbor, Michigan, Michigan 34–27	
 October 1:  4 Michigan at Iowa in Iowa City, Iowa, Michigan 27–14	
 October 8:  4 Michigan at Indiana in Bloomington, Indiana, Michigan 31–10	
 October 15:  10 Penn State at  5 Michigan in Ann Arbor, Michigan, Michigan 41–17
 October 22: Iowa at  2 Ohio State in Columbus, Ohio, Ohio State 54–10	
 October 29:  2 Ohio State at  13 Penn State in University Park, Pennsylvania, Ohio State 44–31	
 November 5: Texas Tech at  7 (CFP  7 TCU in Fort Worth, Texas, TCU 34–24	
 November 12: Indiana at  2 (CFP  2 Ohio State in Columbus, Ohio, Ohio State 56-14
 November 19:  4 (CFP  4 TCU at Baylor in Waco, Texas (with Benetti, Huard and Feldman), TCU 29–28	
 November 26:  3 (CFP  3 Michigan at  2 (CFP  2 Ohio State in Columbus, Ohio, Michigan 45–23	
 December 3: Purdue at  2 (CFP  2 Michigan (2022 Big Ten Championship Game) in Indianapolis, Indiana, (8 ET kickoff), Michigan 43–22

Nielsen ratings

Regular season

Conference championships

Bowls

 Redbox Bowl

 2018 Redbox Bowl (Fox): 2.3
 2019 Redbox Bowl (Fox): 1.2
 2020 Redbox Bowl (Fox): Cancelled due to Covid-19 pandemic

 Holiday Bowl

 2017 Holiday Bowl (FS1): 0.9
 2018 Holiday Bowl (FS1): 0.9
 2019 Holiday Bowl (FS1): 1.3
 2020 Holiday Bowl (FS1): Cancelled due to Covid-19 pandemic

 Cotton Bowl Classic

 1999 Cotton Bowl Classic (Fox): 4.1
 2000 Cotton Bowl Classic (Fox): 4.1
 2001 Cotton Bowl Classic (Fox): 4.4
 2002 Cotton Bowl Classic (Fox): 4.3
 2003 Cotton Bowl Classic (Fox): 3.4
 2004 Cotton Bowl Classic (Fox): 4.3
 2005 Cotton Bowl Classic (Fox): 2.6
 2006 Cotton Bowl Classic (Fox): 3.7
 2007 Cotton Bowl Classic (Fox): 3.7
 2008 Cotton Bowl Classic (Fox): 3.5
 2009 Cotton Bowl Classic (Fox): 4.3
 2010 Cotton Bowl Classic (Fox): 4.5
 2011 Cotton Bowl Classic (Fox): 5.8
 2012 Cotton Bowl Classic (Fox): 5.0
 2013 Cotton Bowl Classic (Fox): 7.2
 2014 Cotton Bowl Classic (Fox): 3.9

 Orange Bowl

 2007 Orange Bowl (Fox): 7.0
 2008 Orange Bowl (Fox): 7.4
 2009 Orange Bowl (Fox): 5.4
 2010 Orange Bowl (Fox): 6.8

 Sugar Bowl

 2007 Sugar Bowl (Fox): 9.3
 2008 Sugar Bowl (Fox): 7.9
 2009 Sugar Bowl (Fox): 7.8
 2010 Sugar Bowl (Fox): 8.5

 Fiesta Bowl

 2007 Fiesta Bowl (Fox): 8.4
 2008 Fiesta Bowl (Fox): 7.7
 2009 Fiesta Bowl (Fox): 10.4
 2010 Fiesta Bowl (Fox): 8.2

 Foster Farms Bowl

 2016 Foster Farms Bowl (Fox) 0.7
 2017 Foster Farms Bowl (Fox) 0.9

 BCS National Championship Game

 2007 BCS National Championship Game (Fox): 17.4
 2008 BCS National Championship Game (Fox): 14.4
 2009 BCS National Championship Game (Fox): 15.8

Personalities

Announcer pairings
Gus Johnson/Joel Klatt/Jenny Taft or Allison Williams or Tom Rinaldi (Fox Big Noon Saturday)Jason Benetti/Brock Huard/Allison Williams or Bruce Feldman  (Fox/FS1)Tim Brando/Spencer Tillman (Fox/FS1)TBA/Mark Helfrich (Fox/FS1)Alex Faust or Jeff Levering or Dan Hellie/Petros Papadakis (FS1)Eric Collins or Adam Alexander/Devin Gardner (FS1)Guy Haberman/Charles Arbuckle or Will Blackmon (FS1)''

Big Noon Kickoff
Hosts

Rob Stone (on site)
Mike Hill (studio)

Analysts

Matt Leinart, Reggie Bush, Brady Quinn, Urban Meyer (on site)
Emmanuel Acho, Chris Petersen (studio)

NCAA Insider

Bruce Feldman

Contributors

Clay Travis
Charles Woodson

Reporter

Tom Rinaldi (on site)

See also
 College football on television
 Bowl Championship Series on television and radio

References

External links

Fox Sports original programming
1999 American television series debuts
2000s American television series
2010s American television series
2020s American television series
College Football
College Football
Fox
College football television series
College Football
College Football